Worth It All may refer to:

 "Worth It All", a song by Jay Sean from the album Neon, originally to be titled Worth It All
 Worth It All (Meredith Andrews album), 2013
 Worth It All, a 2018 album by Jeffrey Osborne